Lomu is a surname from the Pacific Islands, and may refer to:
Andrew Lomu (born 1979), Australian rugby league footballer
Jonah Lomu (1975–2015), New Zealand rugby union footballer
Jonah Lomu Rugby, computer and video game released in 1997, referring to the New Zealand rugby union footballer

Tongan-language surnames